The Old School Renaissance, Old School Revival, or OSR, is a play style movement in tabletop role-playing games which draws inspiration from the earliest days of tabletop RPGs in the 1970s, especially Dungeons & Dragons. It consists of a loose network or community of gamers and game designers who share an interest in a certain style of play and set of game design principles.

Terminology
The terms "old school revival" and "old school renaissance" were first used on the Dragonsfoot forum as early as 2004 and 2005, respectively, to refer to a growing interest in older editions of Dungeons and Dragons and games inspired by those older editions. By February of 2008, a pre-launch call for submissions for Fight On! magazine described it as "a quarterly fanzine for the old-school Renaissance". The two terms (revival and renaissance) continue to be used interchangeably according to user preference, though a 2018 survey found that most respondents understood the R in OSR to mean "renaissance" over "revival", with "rules" and "revolution" as distant third- and fourth-place choices.

History
The OSR movement first developed in the early 2000s, primarily in discussion on internet forums such as Dragonsfoot, Knights & Knaves Alehouse, and Original D&D Discussion, as well as on a large and diverse network of blogs. Partly as a reaction to the publication of the Third Edition of Dungeons and Dragons, interest in and discussion of "old school" play also led to the creation of Dungeons and Dragons retro-clones (legal emulations of RPG rules from the 1970s and early 1980s), including games such as Castles & Crusades and OSRIC which were developed in OSR-related forums. Zines dedicated to OSR content, such as Fight On! and Knockspell, began to be published as early as 2008.

In addition to the development of internet platforms and printed rule books, other printed OSR products became widely available.  In 2008, Matthew Finch (creator of OSRIC) released his free "Quick Primer for Old School Gaming", which tried to sum up the OSR aesthetic. Print-on-demand sites such as Lulu and DriveThruRPG allowed authors to market periodicals, such as Fight On! and many new adventure scenarios and game settings. These continue to be created and marketed, along with older, formerly out of print gaming products, via print-on-demand services.

In 2012, Wizards of the Coast began publishing reprints and PDFs of Advanced Dungeons and Dragons and Dungeons and Dragons Basic Set materials, possibly in response to a perceived market for these materials driven by the OSR.

By the early 2020s, the OSR had inspired such diverse developments in tabletop gaming that new classifications such as "Classic OSR", "OSR-Adjacent", "Nu-OSR" and "Commercial OSR" were being used.

Games

A variety of published RPGs can be understood to be influenced by or part of the OSR trend, ranging from emulations of specific editions of Dungeons and Dragons such as OSRIC and Labyrinth Lord to games such as The Black Hack and Into the Odd, which are designed to recreate the "feel" of 1970s roleplaying while taking only slight (if any) inspiration from the early rules.

Broadly, OSR games encourage a tonal fidelity to Dungeons & Dragons as it was played in the first decade of the game's existence—less emphasis on linear adventure plots and overarching metaplots and a greater emphasis on player agency.

Style of play 
The general ethos of OSR-style play emphasizes spontaneous rulings from the referee, or gamemaster, over set rules found in a book. The idea is for the players to engage with the fantasy as much as possible, and have the referee arbitrate the outcomes of their specific actions in real time. The idea of game balance is also de-emphasized in favor of a system which tests players’ skill and ingenuity in often strange or unfair situations. The players should expect to lose if they merely pit their numbers against the monsters, and should instead attempt to outwit or outmaneuver challenges placed in their way. Keeping maps comes highly recommended.

See also 

 Dungeons & Dragons retro-clones
 History of role-playing games

References

Dungeons & Dragons